Agnieszka Szuchnicka (born 11 February 1962) is a Polish fencer. She competed in the women's team foil event at the 1992 Summer Olympics.

References

External links
 

1962 births
Living people
Polish female fencers
Olympic fencers of Poland
Fencers at the 1992 Summer Olympics
Sportspeople from Gdańsk